Michael Jakobs (born 18 July 1959) is a retired German football player.

References

1959 births
Living people
German footballers
SG Wattenscheid 09 players
VfL Bochum players
FC Schalke 04 players
Hertha BSC players
Germany B international footballers
Bundesliga players
2. Bundesliga players
Association football defenders
Sportspeople from Oberhausen
Footballers from North Rhine-Westphalia